Habrocerus is a genus of rove beetles in the family Staphylinidae. There are about eight described species in Habrocerus.

Species
These eight species belong to the genus Habrocerus:
 Habrocerus canariensis Assing & Wunderle, 1995 g
 Habrocerus capillaricornis (Gravenhorst, 1806) g b
 Habrocerus cyprensis Assing & Wunderle, 1995 g
 Habrocerus ibericus Assing & Wunderle, 1995 g
 Habrocerus magnus LeConte, 1878 g
 Habrocerus pisidicus Korge, 1971 g
 Habrocerus schuelkei Assing & Wunderle, 1996 c g
 Habrocerus schwarzi Horn, 1877 g
Data sources: i = ITIS, c = Catalogue of Life, g = GBIF, b = Bugguide.net

References

Further reading

External links

 

Staphylinidae